Nissan Cohen (born May 8, 1963) is a former Israeli footballer who played for Beitar Tel Aviv in Israeli top division.

Career
Cohen started his career with Beitar Tel Aviv after graduating from its youth system, and was part of the team of midfielders nicknamed "The Three Cohens", along with Nissim Cohen and Yaron Cohen, who took the team to 3rd place (in 1991), its best placing since 1945.

In 1992, Cohen left Beitar Tel Aviv and joined Maccabi Herzliya, along with Nissim Cohen, and won Liga Artzit in his first season with the club. In 1995, Cohen returned to Beitar Tel Aviv for a final season with the club, after which Cohen played for several minor clubs, such as Maccabi Hashikma Ramat Hen, with which he won Liga Bet, and Hapoel Kiryat Ono.

Cohen made one appearance with the national team, against Romania.

Honours
Israeli Second Division:
1992–93
Israel Fifth Division:
2001–02

References

External links
 

1963 births
Israeli Jews
Living people
Israeli footballers
Beitar Tel Aviv F.C. players
Bnei Yehuda Tel Aviv F.C. players
Maccabi Herzliya F.C. players
Maccabi HaShikma Ramat Hen F.C. players
Hapoel Kiryat Ono F.C. players
Liga Leumit players
Association football midfielders